My Lovely Sam Soon (lit. My Name Is Kim Sam-soon) is a South Korean television series based on the internet novel of the same title by Ji Soo-hyun, which was published on March 9, 2004. Touted as the Korean version of Bridget Jones's Diary, it starred Kim Sun-a (who gained 15 pounds for the role), Hyun Bin, Jung Ryeo-won and Daniel Henney. The series aired on MBC from June 1 to July 21, 2005 on Wednesdays and Thursdays at 21:55 for 16 episodes.

"Sam-soon" is an old-fashioned name in Korean culture. It is translated as "3rd daughter" (sam (삼) is three, soon (순) is meek or feminine).

The romantic comedy-drama series was a huge hit, with an average viewership rating of 37.6% and its peak rating of 49.1% (for the finale) makes it one of the highest-rated Korean dramas of all time. It also won numerous awards, including the Baeksang Arts Awards Grand Prize for TV and the Grand Prize at the MBC Drama Awards for Kim Sun-ah.

Synopsis 
Kim Sam-soon (Kim Sun-a) is loud and brash, yet insecure about her weight. She has always been embarrassed by her old-fashioned first name, and nearing her 30th birthday, she dreams of changing it. She is an excellent baker with a fervent passion for making desserts. On Christmas Eve, Sam-soon gets dumped by her cheating boyfriend (Lee Kyu-han) and loses her job. One of the witnesses to her public humiliation is Hyun Jin-heon (Hyun Bin), the owner of upscale French restaurant Bon Appetit. Upon recognizing her talent, Jin-heon hires her as Bon Appetit's new pastry chef. From their first meeting, the two have an antagonistic relationship (she calls him the equally old-fashioned "Sam-shik"), and sparks fly.

Jin-heon is the son of a wealthy hotelier (Na Moon-hee), and his mother constantly nags him about succeeding her in the hotel business. She also keeps setting him up on matchmaking dates, saying his niece Mi-joo (Seo Ji-hee), who hasn't spoken a word since the childhood trauma of her parents' deaths, needs a mother figure. They draw up a complicated contract, of which the most important stipulation is that they should never fall in love for real. But as they spend more time together, Sam-soon and Jin-heon grow closer and gradually fall for each other. But just when things are going well, Jin-heon's ex-girlfriend Yoo Hee-jin (Jung Ryeo-won) returns from the United States.

Hee-jin had suddenly left Korea years ago, right after a car accident that had killed Jin-heon's older brother, his sister-in-law and a motorcyclist, and left Jin-heon (who was driving) seriously injured. Though Jin-heon's leg eventually recovered, emotional scars remained, a mixture of sorrow, guilt, and anger at Hee-jin's abandonment. But what he didn't know was that Hee-jin had been diagnosed at the time with stomach cancer, and she'd broken up with him because she didn't want to add to the tragedy he was already experiencing. Now in remission, she returns to Korea to ask for a second chance, followed by her Korean-American doctor Henry Kim (Daniel Henney), who is in love with Hee-jin and eager to learn his roots. Upon learning the truth, Jin-heon reconciles with Hee-jin.

Broken-hearted, Sam-soon resigns from Bon Appetit, and she and her older sister Yi-young (Lee Ah-hyun) decide to open an online pastry business using Yi-young's settlement from her recent divorce. Meanwhile, Jin-heon can't stop thinking about Sam-soon and realizes that he wants to be with her. After several run-ins in which he sabotages her blind date and immaturely invents reasons to see her, he finally confesses his love for Sam-soon. After a difficult break-up with Hee-jin, Jin-heon proves to Sam-soon's mother and sister that he's serious about her and the couple begin dating happily.

Then Hee-jin asks a final favor of Jin-heon, to accompany her back to the U.S. to rejoin her parents there. Sam-soon is initially resistant, but later gives her blessing when Jin-heon reassures her that this journey will be a form of closure for him and Hee-jin. He promises to return after one week. Sam-soon goes once again to the city clerk's office to have her name changed, but finally believing that her name is special and an important part of her identity, changes her mind at the last minute and tears up the papers.

Two months pass, with no calls or letters from Jin-heon, and Sam-soon has given up on him and gone on with her life.

When Jin-heon eventually returns to Korea, she gives him the cold shoulder. But the misunderstanding is cleared up when two months' worth of postcards gets delivered to Sam-soon's house; as they had been sent to the wrong address all this time. Jin-heon had spent the two months traveling and inspecting hotels all over America; in his desire to be a man worthy of Sam-soon, he is finally ready to take up the reins as his mother's heir. Whatever obstacles come their way (including his mother's continuing benign disapproval of their relationship), Sam-soon and Jin-heon decide to face the future together, doing their best at work and love, and living life to the fullest.

Cast 
Main characters
 Kim Sun-a – Kim Sam-soon, 30-year-old pastry chef
 Hyun Bin – Hyun Jin-heon, 27-year-old owner of Bon Appetit restaurant
 Jung Ryeo-won – Yoo Hee-jin, Jin-heon's ex-girlfriend
 Daniel Henney – Dr. Henry Kim, Hee-jin's doctor

Supporting characters
 Kim Ja-ok – Park Bong-sook, Sam-soon's mother
 Lee Ah-hyun – Kim Yi-young, Sam-soon's sister
 Na Moon-hee – Na Hyun-sook, Jin-heon's mother
 Seo Ji-hee – Hyun Mi-joo, Jin-heon's niece
 Yoon Ye-hee – Yoon Hyun-sook, CEO Na's assistant
 Lee Kyu-han – Min Hyun-woo, Sam-soon's ex-boyfriend
 Lee Yoon-mi – Jang Chae-ri
 Won Jong-rye – Chae-ri's mother
 Maeng Bong-hak – Sam-soon's father
 Kim Sung-kyum – Jin-heon's uncle

Restaurant staff
 Yeo Woon-kay – Ms. Oh, manager
 Kwon Hae-hyo – Lee Hyun-moo, chef
 Han Yeo-woon – Lee In-hye, Sam-soon's assistant
 Kim Hyun-jung – Jang Young-ja, dining room captain
 Kim Ki-bang – Ki-bang, kitchen assistant

Reception 
Some critics believe its huge success was due to the show's focus on the life of a single woman in her late twenties. Particularly, the heroine's chubby physical appearance and frank, flawed yet lovable personality broke long-held Korean drama stereotypes, greatly increasing its popularity due to its resonance with many Koreans.

Ratings 
In the table below, the blue numbers represent the lowest ratings and the red numbers represent the highest ratings.

Soundtrack 

The My Lovely Sam-soon soundtrack was released on June 18, 2005. Korean electronica band Clazziquai contributed two songs to the soundtrack: "Be My Love" and "She Is", the former of which became the show's theme song. The show's popularity brought the group increased media and public attention.

Awards and nominations

International broadcast 
 The series first aired in Japan on cable channel KNTV from August 15 to October 4, 2005. Reruns followed on satellite channel Wowow beginning July 6, 2006 on Thursdays at 8 p.m., on the Fuji TV network as part of its Hallyu Alpha programming block beginning February 1, 2010, and on cable channel DATV.
 It first aired in the Philippines on the GMA Network from February to April 2006, during which it received a peak viewership rating of 40.2% and an average viewership rating of 34.9%, placing it among the top ten highest rated Asian dramas to air in the country. It was rebroadcast on GMA Network in 2009 and again in 2015.
 In Thailand first aired on ITV beginning September 23, 2006, with reruns on Channel 7 from August 11 to September 16, 2008.  
 In Sri Lanka, it began airing on Rupavahini dubbed in Sinhalese under the name Hithata Horen in September 2018.

Stage adaptation 
A stage adaptation (which was based more on the original novel than the TV series) ran at the Sangmyung Art Hall in Seoul from January 21 to September 25, 2011.

Remakes

A 2008 Philippine remake titled Ako si Kim Samsoon starred Regine Velasquez and Mark Anthony Fernandez.

A 2020 Thailand remake titled My name is Busaba starred Namthip Jongrachatawiboon and Thanapat Kawila on One31 HD.

References

External links 
My Name Is Kim Sam-soon official MBC website 
My Lovely Sam-soon at MBC Global Media
My Lovely Sam-soon at Korea Tourism Organization

MBC TV television dramas
2005 South Korean television series debuts
2005 South Korean television series endings
Korean-language television shows
South Korean romantic comedy television series
South Korean television series remade in other languages
Television shows based on South Korean novels